"Somos El Mundo 25 Por Haiti" is a 2010 song and charity single recorded by the Latin supergroup Artists for Haiti and written by Emilio Estefan and his wife Gloria Estefan. It is a Spanish-language remake of the 1985 hit song "We Are the World", which was written by American musicians Michael Jackson and Lionel Richie, and was recorded by USA for Africa to benefit famine relief in Africa.

Around the time that the English remake version of the song "We Are the World 25 for Haiti" was released, it was announced that Emilio and Gloria Estefan were planning to record a Spanish version of the song featuring musicians of Latino descent. "Somos El Mundo 25 Por Haiti" was recorded on February 19, 2010, and the song was premiered on March 1, during the El Show de Cristina television show. It has been confirmed that all revenue from "Somos El Mundo 25 Por Haiti" will go to earthquake relief in Haiti.

Background
Emilio and Gloria Estefan, along with Quincy Jones and other singers joined forces with Univision to record a Spanish version of "We Are the World" to raise money for Haitian earthquake victims. The song was adapted by Emilio and Gloria Estefan. Univision was a co-producer and distributor of the song.

This version was recorded on February 19, 2010, at American Airlines Arena in Miami. Olga Tañon was the first artist to put her voice on February 17, 2010, because previous commitments prevented her from participating in the recording group. The singer said that she was assigned to interpret a stanza which corresponds to the one Cyndi Lauper sung in the original 1985 version. Others who participated in a previous recording session were Jose Feliciano, José Luis Rodríguez and Ricardo Montaner. The song premiered during El Show de Cristina on March 1, 2010.

Artists for Haiti musicians

Conductors
Emilio Estefan
Gloria Estefan
Quincy Jones
Soloists (in order of appearance)
Juanes
Ricky Martin
José Feliciano
Vicente Fernández
Luis Enrique
Romeo Santos
Pee Wee
Belinda
José Luis Rodríguez
Banda El Recodo
Shakira
Thalía
Jenni Rivera
Tito El Bambino
Kany García
Luis Fonsi
Jon Secada
Willy Chirino
Lissette
Ana Bárbara
Gilberto Santa Rosa
Juan Luis Guerra
David Archuleta
Cristian Castro
Ednita Nazario
Paquita la del Barrio
Ricardo Montaner
Gloria Estefan
Luis Miguel (voice)
Chayanne
Olga Tañón
Natalia Jiménez
Paulina Rubio
Nicky Jam
Melina León
Pitbull (rap)
Taboo (rap)
Daddy Yankee (rap)

Chorus
A.B. Quintanilla
Alacranes Musical
Alejandro Fernández
Aleks Syntek
Alexandra Cheron
Andy García
Angélica María
Angélica Vale
Arthur Hanlon
Carlos Santana (guitar)
Christian Chávez
Cristina Saralegui
Diana Reyes
Eddy Herrera
Eiza González
Emily Estefan (Emilio & Gloria Estefan's daughter on guitar)
Enrique Iglesias
Fernando Villalona
Flex
Fonseca
Gloria Trevi
Jencarlos Canela
Johnny Pacheco
Jorge Celedón
Jorge Moreno
Jorge Villamizar
Joselyn Rivera
La Arrolladora Banda El Limón
Kat DeLuna
K-Paz de la Sierra
Lena Burke
Lucero
Luz Rios
Marc Anthony
Miguel Bosé
Milly Quezada
Montez de Durango
Ojeda
Patricia Manterola
Rey Ruiz
Sergio Mayer
Wisin & Yandel

Track listings
iTunes Digital Download
"Somos el Mundo 25 por Haiti" (song) — 6:49
"Somos el Mundo 25 por Haiti" (video) — 7:00

Awards

Premio Juventud

|-
| 2010 || Somos El Mundo|| La Combinacion Perfecta (The Perfect Combination)||

Charts

References

External links

2010 Haiti earthquake relief
2010 singles
All-star recordings
Songs against racism and xenophobia
Charity singles
Pop ballads
Songs written by Gloria Estefan
Songs about Haiti
2010 songs
Univision Music Group singles
Songs written by Emilio Estefan
Songs written by Michael Jackson
Songs written by Lionel Richie
Songs written by Daddy Yankee